Xavier Hutchinson (born June 1, 2000) is an American football wide receiver for the Iowa State Cyclones.

High school career
Hutchinson attended Bartram Trail High School in St. Johns, Florida. As a senior, he had 74 receptions for 1,004 receiving yards and 11 touchdowns

College career
Hutchinson attended Blinn College for two years before transferring to Iowa State University. In his two years at Blinn, he had 58 receptions for 961 yards and seven touchdowns. In his first year at Iowa State in 2020, Hutchinson started all 12 games and led the Big 12 with 64 receptions for 771 yards with four touchdowns. In 2021, he started 12 of 13 games and had a school-record 83 receptions for 987 yards and five touchdowns. Hutchinson returned to Iowa State for the 2022 season, rather than enter the 2022 NFL Draft.

Statistics

References

External links
Iowa State Cyclones bio

2000 births
Living people
Players of American football from Florida
American football wide receivers
Blinn Buccaneers football players
Iowa State Cyclones football players